Lick Fork may refer to:

Lick Fork (Perche Creek), a stream in Missouri
Lick Fork, West Virginia, an unincorporated community